Stitzer is an unincorporated community in the town of Liberty in Grant County, Wisconsin, United States.

History
A post office called Stitzer has been in operation since 1879. The community was named for Bernard Stizer, a local farmer.

Notes

Unincorporated communities in Grant County, Wisconsin
Unincorporated communities in Wisconsin